Peter Graham (July 16, 1821 – July 19, 1900) was an Ontario farmer and political figure. He represented Lambton East in the Legislative Assembly of Ontario as a Liberal member from 1875 to 1890.

He was born in Kirkoswald, Cumberland, England in 1821 and came to Vaudreuil County, Lower Canada with his family in 1834. He served in the local militia during the Lower Canada Rebellion. Later, he moved to Wentworth County in Upper Canada before finally settling in Warwick Township in Lambton County. He served on the township council for Warwick, serving as reeve for several years. He was also named a justice of the peace. He supported giving the vote to women. He helped introduce the Tile Drainage Act, which helped farmers gain funding to drain wetlands on their land. In 1890, he was appointed bursar for the Hamilton Insane Asylum and served in that position until his death in 1900.

External links 

A Cyclopæedia of Canadian biography : being chiefly men of the time..., GM Rose (1886)
Lambton County's Hundred Years, 1849 - 1949, V Lauriston (1949)

1821 births
1900 deaths
19th-century Methodists
Canadian Methodists
Ontario Liberal Party MPPs
People from Kirkoswald, Cumbria